Suck on Light is the fourth studio album of the Australian indie band Boy & Bear. It was released on 27 September 2019 and peaked at number 7 on the Australian ARIA Albums Chart, becoming the band's fourth top 10 album.
 
The album was produced and mixed by the band and Collin Dupuis, and partly mixed by British mixing engineer Tom Elmhirst.

Track listing
 "Work of Art"	– 4:02
 "Suck on Light" – 4:39
 "Bird of Paradise" – 3:57
 "Telescope" – 3:23
 "Dry Eyes" – 2:36
 "Long Long Way" – 4:45
 "Off My Head" – 3:47
 "Bad People" – 3:22
 "Hold Your Nerve" – 3:35
 "Rocking Horse" – 3:39
 "BCS" – 3:14
 "Vesuvius" – 6:01

All songs written by Boy & Bear.

Charts

References

2019 albums
Boy & Bear albums